is a group of islands ranging in the west coast of Kitamatsuura Peninsula, Nagasaki Prefecture, Japan.

The name Kujūku-shima translates to "ninety-nine islands", though the total number of the islands is formally considered to be two hundred and eight. The whole area is designated as part of Saikai National Park.

The two biggest islands, Kuro-shima and Taka-shima, are easily accessible by ferry from the harbour of Ainoura in the north of Sasebo three times a day.

Kuro-shima 
Kuro-shima ("Black Island"), the biggest island covering 5.3 km², has about 650 inhabitants who are mostly the descendants of Catholics who hid here to escape persecution after the Shimabara Rebellion of 1637. The island church, Kuroshima Tenshudō, was built in 1902. It is one of the rare brick churches in Japan. It was declared an "Important National Heritage" in 1998. There are some well-preserved old houses on the island showing the traditional architecture.

Most of the island is covered by dense forest. There are a few paddy fields on Kuro-shima as well, some of them are terraces which are very rare in Japan. In the middle of the island, there is a school, an administration building and a shop. The small harbour of Kuro-shima is in the north of the island.

Taka-shima 
Taka-shima ("High Island"), the second largest island covering 2.6 km², has about 250 inhabitants. Its tallest mountain is 138 m.

Gallery

See also
Saikai Pearl Sea Resort

References

External links
 The introduction of Saikai National Park Kujū-ku Islands(at the Saikai pearl sea resort site) 
 SAIKAI PEARLSEA RESORT Official Site 
 

Archipelagoes of Japan
Islands of Nagasaki Prefecture
Archipelagoes of the Pacific Ocean